Zachary Rich Mettenberger (born July 16, 1991) is a former American football quarterback who played in the National Football League (NFL) for three seasons, primarily with the Tennessee Titans. He played college football at LSU and was selected by the Titans in the sixth round of the 2014 NFL Draft. After two seasons in Tennessee, Mettenberger spent his final NFL year as a backup for the Pittsburgh Steelers. Mettenberger last played professionally with the Memphis Express of the Alliance of American Football (AAF) in 2019. He began a coaching career the following year and has been an analyst for the University of Alabama since 2022.

Early years
Mettenberger attended Oconee County High School in Watkinsville, Georgia. As a senior on the football team, he threw 2,106 yards passing with 19 touchdowns and six interceptions. He was ranked as the 11th best pro-style quarterback recruit in his class by Rivals.com.

College career
Mettenberger originally attended the University of Georgia where he redshirted the 2009 season, but was kicked off the team due to a violation of team rules.  On April 30, 2010, Mettenberger pleaded guilty to two misdemeanor sexual battery charges stemming from an incident at a bar near Valdosta, Georgia. He transferred to Butler Community College, where he became the starter for the 2010 season. In his lone season at Butler, he threw for 2,678 passing yards with 32 touchdowns and four interceptions. He led Butler to an 11–1 record and the JUCO National Championship game.

Prior to the 2011 season, Mettenberger transferred to Louisiana State University. In his first season at LSU, he completed 8-of-11 pass attempts for 92 yards and a touchdown in limited action. In 2012, he took over as the starting quarterback. He led the team to a 10–3 record, completing 58.8% of his passes for 2,609 yards, 12 touchdowns, and seven interceptions. With the arrival of Cam Cameron as offensive coordinator in 2013, Mettenberger led LSU to a 9–3 regular season record, completing 64.9% of his passes for 3,082 yards, 22 touchdowns, and eight interceptions with a yards per pass attempt of 10.41 and a quarterback rating of 171.4. He was the first LSU quarterback to throw for 2,500 or more yards in back-to-back seasons and was a two-time team captain. Mettenberger tore his ACL in LSU's final regular season game against Arkansas. He underwent surgery and 13 weeks later, he fully participated in LSU's Pro Day. He threw nearly 125 passes while wearing a helmet and shoulder pads and completed over 90% of his passes. He graduated from Louisiana State in December 2013 with a degree in General Studies.

Collegiate statistics

Professional career

Tennessee Titans

Mettenberger was drafted by the Tennessee Titans in the 6th round (pick number 178 overall) of the 2014 NFL Draft.

On September 28, 2014, Mettenberger made his NFL debut in relief of Charlie Whitehurst in a 41–17 loss to the Indianapolis Colts. He went 2-of-5 for 17 yards with an interception.

On October 22, 2014, the Titans decided that Mettenberger would start over Jake Locker and Whitehurst against the Houston Texans. Mettenberger and the Titans lost 30–16 to the Texans. Mettenberger was 27 of 41 for 299 yards with two touchdowns and an interception.

Mettenberger started against the Pittsburgh Steelers on his Monday Night Football debut on November 17, 2014, going 15-of-24 for two touchdowns and an interception and hitting former Steeler Nate Washington for an 80-yard touchdown. During a 36–7 blowout loss to the New York Giants, Mettenberger sustained a shoulder injury and missed the last 3 games. Mettenberger finished his rookie season with 8 touchdowns, 7 interceptions, and 1,412 passing yards while also rushing for 4 yards. He started in six games for the Titans, all losses.

Mettenberger played in seven games and started four of them in 2015 due to injuries to starter Marcus Mariota. He threw for 935 yards and four touchdowns with seven interceptions while also rushing for 8 yards and a touchdown. Mettenberger was released by the Titans on May 16, 2016.

San Diego Chargers
On May 17, 2016, Mettenberger was claimed off waivers by the San Diego Chargers. On August 30, 2016, Mettenberger was cut by the Chargers.

Pittsburgh Steelers
On August 31, 2016, Mettenberger was claimed off waivers by the Pittsburgh Steelers. He did not play in any games during the 2016 NFL season and was inactive for 12 of the Steelers' 16 regular season games, as well as all three playoff games.

Mettenberger was active for Weeks 4 and 5 (against the Kansas City Chiefs and New York Jets, respectively) as the third quarterback behind Ben Roethlisberger and Landry Jones. He was also active as the backup for Weeks 7 and 17 (against the New England Patriots and Cleveland Browns, respectively) behind Jones while Roethlisberger recovered from an injury in the former contest and rested for the playoffs in the latter.

Following the Steelers' drafting of Joshua Dobbs in the fourth round of the 2017 NFL Draft, Mettenberger was released on May 1, 2017.

Alternative leagues
In 2018, Mettenberger joined The Spring League and was assigned to the West team.

Memphis Express
In August 2018, Mettenberger signed with the newly-formed Alliance of American Football's Memphis Express. Later on November 27, Mettenberger was drafted by the Express in the fourth round of the 2019 AAF QB Draft.

Mettenerger opened the 2019 AAF season as the third-string quarterback behind Christian Hackenberg and Brandon Silvers. For the third game of the year against the Orlando Apollos, he became the backup after Silvers suffered an injury, and entered the game during the second half to replace a struggling Hackenberg; despite losing 21–17, Mettenberger threw for 120 yards and two touchdowns. On February 25, Express head coach Mike Singletary named Mettenberger the starter. In his first start against the San Diego Fleet, he completed 18 of 25 passes for 174 yards and a passing touchdown, and also ran for another as Memphis won 26–23, the first victory in team history.

Against the Salt Lake Stallions on March 16, Mettenberger was injured and replaced by Silvers. The Express announced the signing of quarterback Johnny Manziel soon after the game. Mettenberger was placed on injured reserve on March 18. The league ceased operations in April 2019.

2020
After being passed up in the 2020 XFL Draft, Mettenberger re-signed with The Spring League as starting quarterback for the Las Vegas Hughes, the host team. He lost the starting quarterback competition against Bryan Scott.

Mettenberger was selected by the Generals in The Spring League's player selection draft on October 12, 2020.

NFL career statistics

Coaching career
In July 2020, Mettenberger was announced as the new offensive coordinator of the Hillsboro High School football team, having previously expressed interest in coaching at the school during his playing career. In September 2021, he was announced as an assistant football coach for Father Ryan High School.  In February 2022, Mettenberger joined the staff of the Alabama Crimson Tide as a coaching analyst.

References

External links

LSU Tigers bio 
Tennessee Titans bio

1991 births
Living people
Players of American football from Georgia (U.S. state)
American football quarterbacks
Butler Grizzlies football players
Georgia Bulldogs football players
LSU Tigers football players
Tennessee Titans players
San Diego Chargers players
Pittsburgh Steelers players
American people of German descent
People from Watkinsville, Georgia
The Spring League players
Memphis Express (American football) players
High school football coaches in Tennessee
Alabama Crimson Tide football coaches